Meritxell Palmitjavila Naudí (born 20 December 1964) is an Andorran politician, current Deputy General Syndic of the General Council of Andorra since 3 May 2019, she is the Deputy Speaker of the Parliament of Andorra.

She had been teacher in several Andorran schools between 1985 and 2015. Between 2009 and 2010 she was the Director of the Department of Support to Education and Educational Inspection by the Ministry of Education

Palmitjavila is member of the General Council since was elected in the 2015 Andorran parliamentary election.

In the 2019 Andorran parliamentary election she head the Democrats for Andorra in the parish of Canillo and was re-elected lawmaker.

As she was the older member of the General Council, she presided the session of constitution of the new Parliament on 2 May 2019 where was elected Deputy General Syndic.

References 

1964 births
Living people
Democrats for Andorra politicians
Members of the General Council (Andorra)
Andorran women in politics
20th-century women politicians
Andorran schoolteachers
21st-century educators
20th-century educators
20th-century women educators
21st-century women educators